Shrewsbury is a ghost town in the Canadian province of Quebec, located within the township of Gore in Argenteuil Regional County Municipality.

For a time its sole remaining structure is the so-called Shrewsbury ghost church, but now this church has burned down.

References

External links
 Shrewsbury: The Vanished Village

Communities in Laurentides
Ghost towns in Quebec